Three Argentines in Paris (Spanish:Tres anclados en París) is a 1938 Argentine musical comedy film directed by Manuel Romero and starring Florencio Parravicini, Tito Lusiardo and Irma Córdoba.

The film's sets were designed by Ricardo J. Conord.

Cast
 Florencio Parravicini as Domínguez  
 Tito Lusiardo as Eustaquio Pedernera  
 Irma Córdoba as Ángela Torres  
 Enrique Serrano as Eleodoro López  
 Hugo del Carril as Ricardo  
 Juan Mangiante as Carlos Torres  
 Alímedes Nelson as Ketty López 
 Elvira Pagã as herself  
 Rosina Pagã as herself  
 Carlos Morganti 
 José Alfayate
 Amalia Bernabé as Argentinean tourist in Paris
 Héctor Méndez as Director in assembly

References

Bibliography 
  Leslie Bethell. A Cultural History of Latin America: Literature, Music and the Visual Arts in the 19th and 20th Centuries. Cambridge University Press, 1998.

External links 
 

1938 films
Argentine musical comedy films
1938 musical comedy films
1930s Spanish-language films
Films directed by Manuel Romero
Films set in Paris
Argentine black-and-white films
1930s Argentine films